Stephen Arpin (born December 16, 1983) is a Canadian race car driver competing in Nitro Rallycross. He previously raced stock cars in the ARCA Racing Series, the NASCAR Camping World Truck Series and the Nationwide Series. His first season with ARCA was in 2009, finishing 7th in the championship standings and winning the ARCA RE/MAX Series Most Popular Driver Award. He was also the 2008 USAC Silver Crown Series Rookie of the Year.

Racing career

Early career
Arpin was born in Fort Frances, Ontario. He made his racing debut in Go-Karts at Riverside Speedway in Rainy River, Ontario at the age of 10. He won several races as a rookie and was at the top of the standings most of his karting career. By the age of 14, Arpin started racing Mini-Sprints at the Emo Speedway in 1997. The following year, he moved straight to WISSOTA Modifieds and, in 1999, took the track championship in the class. After finishing second in track standings in 2000, Arpin returned to the top in 2001 by winning every feature event at the track, claiming his second track championship in three years. He won the majority of races in 2002, just missing his third championship.

NASCAR
It was announced in the summer of 2010 that Arpin would drive the No. 7 Chevy for JR Motorsports in a limited schedule, as a fill-in for Danica Patrick. Talks with JRM's owner Dale Earnhardt Jr. started in 2009. This was made public during the Rattlesnake 150 ARCA event, which Arpin won. Arpin made his first start in that summer at the Aaron's 312, where he was competitive until being caught in a wreck late in the event. His first top-10 finish came in the 2010 Subway Jalapeño 250 powered by Coca-Cola with a 10th-place finish.

In 2011, Arpin made his NASCAR Camping World Truck Series debut at Texas Motor Speedway, driving the No. 32 Mike's Hard Lemonade Chevrolet Silverado for Turner Motorsports.

In 2012, Arpin competed in two Nationwide races for Turner, at Texas and Iowa Speedway. Aprin finished 10th and 16th respectively. Arpin also returned to the ARCA Racing Series with Venturini Motorsports at both Elko Speedway and Springfield.

Global RallyCross Championship

For 2013, Arpin received the opportunity to compete for the Global Rallycross Championship alongside teammate, fellow NASCAR competitor Scott Speed.

In 2015, Arpin was signed by Chip Ganassi Racing to compete full-time in the GRC.

Dirt track racing
In 2002, Arpin began to increase his travels throughout the United States, especially in Minnesota. At the age of 18, he took the feature win at the Silver 1000 in Proctor, Minnesota and the WISSOTA 100 at Cedar Lake Speedway which garnered him large attention in the WISSOTA region. Steve also won the largest modified race east of the Mississippi at Brushcreek Motorsports Complex, the American Heritage classic. For winning the Heritage Classic, he won a Harley-Davidson Soft Tail motorcycle.

Snowmobile oval racing
In his early teens, Arpin also raced snowmobiles during the winter. He won several events at the local scene and was picked up shortly thereafter by Polaris Industries, becoming the youngest driver to ever compete for the company. Throughout his time of snowmobiles, he captured three world championships, four Polaris championships, and many feature wins.

Americas Rallycross Championship
In 2018, Arpin and Loenbro Motorsports competed in the 2018 ARX season. He finished 6th in total points at the end of the season.

In 2019, Arpin Arpin and Loenbro Motorsports along his new teammate Travis Pecoy. Arpin finished 4th in total points at the end of the season.

Accomplishments

ARCA Re/Max Series
2010 Most Popular Driver Award
2010 Southern Illinois 100 at DuQuoin Dirt Race Winner
2010 Rattlesnake 150 at Texas Motor Speedway Race Winner
2010 Kentuckiana Ford Dealers 200 Race Winner
2009 Most Popular Driver Award

USAC Silver Crown Series

2008 Rookie of the Year

Dirt track racing
2008 Minnesota Modified Nationals Champion
2007 18 Feature Wins & 42 top 5 finishes in an open wheel modified throughout the United States.
2007 Fall Modified Nationals (Day 1) Champion
2007 WISSOTA Heartland Nationals Champion – Deer Creek Speedway
2007 Memorial Day Special Champion – Rice Lake Speeedway
2007 101 American Heritage Classic Champion – Brushcreek Motorsports Complex
2007 IMCA Dakota Classic Modified Tour Champion – Won Every Heat & Feature (5 Nights)
2007 North Florida Nationals Champion – Lake City, FL
2007 Florida DIRTcar WinterNationals UMP Modified Points Champion
2006 United States Modified Touring Series Featherlite Fall Jamboree Champion
2006 17 Feature Wins in an open wheel Modified throughout the United States
2006 Coca-Cola Young Guns Shoot-out Champion – Savannah, Georgia
2006 Carolina Clash Champion – Cedar Lake Speedway, Wisconsin
2005 Deer Creek Speedway Sportsman of the Year
2004 Gopher 50 Charity Race Champion
2004 8th Place WISSOTA National Points
2004 Cedar Lake Speedway Overall Hard Charger Award
2003 Rice Lake Speedway Labor Day Special Champion
2002 Cedar Lake Speedway WISSOTA 100 Champion
2002 Emo Speedway Driver of the Year and Sportsman of the Year
2002 Proctor Speedway Silver 1000 Feature Winner
2001 Emo Speedway WISSOTA Modifieds Track Champion
2001 Emo Speedway Driver of the Year / Sportsman of the Year
2001 Emo Speedway Winner of Every feature Event
1999 Emo Speedway WISSOTA Modifieds Track Champion

Snowmobile oval racing
2002 Eagle River World Championship Pro Stock 600 Champion
2002 Polaris Industries Pro Stock 440 Champion
2002 Polaris Industries Pro Stock 600 Champion
2002 Polaris Industries Woody's Triple Crown Champion
2001 Polaris Industries Pro Open Champion
2001 Eagle River World Championships Pro Stock 440 Champion
2001 Eagle River World Championships Pro Stock 600 Champion

Motorsports career results

NASCAR
(key) (Bold – Pole position awarded by qualifying time. Italics – Pole position earned by points standings or practice time. * – Most laps led.)

Nationwide Series

Camping World Truck Series

ARCA Racing Series
(key) (Bold – Pole position awarded by qualifying time. Italics – Pole position earned by points standings or practice time. * – Most laps led.)

Complete Global RallyCross Championship results
(key)

Supercar

Complete Americas Rallycross Championship results
(key)

Supercar

References

External links

 
 

Living people
1983 births
Sportspeople from Fort Frances
Racing drivers from Ontario
NASCAR drivers
ARCA Menards Series drivers
Global RallyCross Championship drivers
USAC Silver Crown Series drivers
JR Motorsports drivers
Chip Ganassi Racing drivers